Lycorea halia halia, the tropical milkweed butterfly, is a subspecies of Lycorea halia, also called the tropical milkweed butterfly, a nymphalid butterfly in the Danainae subfamily. It is found from Suriname, French Guiana and Peru to the Caribbean. Its habitat is tropical rainforest.

References

Danaini
Fauna of Brazil
Nymphalidae of South America
Butterflies described in 1816
Butterflies of the Caribbean
Taxa named by Jacob Hübner
Butterfly subspecies